Miller Music Corp. v. Charles N. Daniels, Inc., 362 U.S. 373 (1960), was a United States Supreme Court case in which the Court held the executor of a copyright holder's will is eligible to renew that copyright.

References

External links
 

1960 in United States case law
United States Supreme Court cases
United States Supreme Court cases of the Warren Court